
Gmina Choceń is a rural gmina (administrative district) in Włocławek County, Kuyavian-Pomeranian Voivodeship, in north-central Poland.

Villages
Gmina Choceń contains the villages and settlements of Bodzanówek, Bodzanowo, Borzymie, Borzymowice, Choceń, Czerniewice, Filipki, Gajówka, Grabówka, Janowo, Jarantowice, Jerzewo, Kępka Szlachecka (part), Krukowo, Kuźnice, Lijewo, Łopatki, Ługowiska, Lutobórz, Niemojewo, Nowa Wola, Olganowo, Pustki Śmiłowskie, Skibice, Śmiłowice, Stare Nakonowo, Stefanowo, Świerkowo, Szatki, Szczutkowo, Szczytno, Wichrowice, Wilkowice, Wilkowiczki, Wola Nakonowska, Ząbin, Zakrzewek and Zapust.

Neighbouring gminas
Gmina Choceń is bordered by the gminas of Boniewo, Chodecz, Kowal, Lubień Kujawski, Lubraniec and Włocławek.

References
Polish official population figures 2006

Chocen
Włocławek County